Frogstomp is the debut studio album by Australian alternative rock band Silverchair. It was released on 27 March 1995, when the band members were only 15 years of age, by record label Murmur. The album features the band's commercially most successful single, "Tomorrow".

Recording
Frogstomp was recorded in nine days.

When asked if the record was made live in the studio, singer and guitarist Daniel Johns said: Yeah, that's the thing that I do really like about that album – it sounds exactly like we sounded. There was no big American producer calling the shots behind the desk and telling us to do this, this and this. It was literally this guy, Kevin Shirley, who was a great producer, just saying, "I want it to sound like you guys, but I want it to sound really f—ing loud and I want the guitars really f—ing loud." So to me, I was like, f—ing yeah! The songwriting might not be genius, but I think sonically, the performances are really good. It's really honest; it's just three Australian kids thrashing it out in the studio and that's exactly how it sounds.

Title
When asked why the album's name is Frogstomp, Johns said: I was at a guy from our record company's house one night and I was looking through his CDs because he's got a really good collection. I found this '60s pop collection record and I was just going (laughs), "Why do you have this?" I looked at the back and there was this song that some guy did called frogstomp and I said, "That's a pretty good name." (laughs) I just rang up Ben and Chris and we just thought it was really funny so we used it for the album.

Release
Frogstomp was released on 27 March 1995 by record label Murmur.

It reached number 1 on Australian ARIA Albums Chart. On 20 June 1995, Frogstomp was released by Epic in the United States. It has since been certified double platinum by the RIAA.

The LP version of the album is sold in a green vinyl with "Blind" as a bonus track limited to 3,000 copies worldwide. There is also a limited cassette edition of the album.

On 27 March 2015, a remastered edition of Frogstomp was released as a two-CD/DVD set to mark the twentieth anniversary of its release.

Reception

Stephen Thomas Erlewine of AllMusic rated the album 4 out of 5 stars, and wrote, "For their age [15 years old], their instrumental capabilities are quite impressive, as the guitars and vocals growl with the force of rockers in their early twenties. At the same time, their songwriting abilities aren't as strong, and they are never able to break away from the standard grunge formula. Nevertheless, the record does deliver a collection of songs replicating the thunder of "Tomorrow". Chuck Eddy of Entertainment Weekly wrote: "the songs on Frogstomp almost all start out like dreary Metallica ballads and build toward gloomy, by-the-numbers grunge." David Fricke of Rolling Stone, on the other hand, wrote: "Truly shameless wanna-be's  like Bush should be so lucky to have the hard smarts that Silverchair – particularly the band's main writers, singer-guitarist Daniel Johns and drummer Ben Gillies – show on such Frogstomp-ers as 'Pure Massacre' and 'Israel's Son'. When these guys turn 18, they'll really be dangerous."

Legacy
In 2015, James Rose of the Daily Review wrote of the album, "As an album in its own right, it's pretty good. As a debut by three 15-year-olds, it's about as good as it gets. There are still kids out there today listening to Frogstomp and shitting themselves. And so they should."

The album was ranked #25 on Double J's list of Top 50 Australian Albums of the '90s.

Mixdown listed the album as among the seven best Australian grunge albums.

The Amity Affliction member Ahren Stringer said of the album: "I was obsessed with Frogstomp as a 12-year-old boy. I wanted to be Daniel Johns."

ABC wrote that in 1995, Silverchair provided a "thrilling synthesis of rage, confusion and pain, and as a distillation of teen angst, you couldn't get a purer generational timestamp than Frogstomp."

In December of 2021, the album was listed at no. 6 in Rolling Stone Australia’s '200 Greatest Albums of All Time' countdown.

Track listing

2015 20th anniversary remastered deluxe edition bonus DVD
"Madman" (live at the Cambridge)
"Blind" (live at the Cambridge)
"Tomorrow" (live at the Cambridge)
"Faultline" (live at the Cambridge)
"Pure Massacre" (live at the Cambridge)
"Israel's Son" (live from the Easter show, 1995)
"Tomorrow" (music video, US version)
"Pure Massacre" (music video)
"Israel's Son" (music video)

Personnel
Silverchair
 Daniel Johns – guitar, vocals
 Ben Gillies – drums
 Chris Joannou – bass guitar

Charts

Weekly charts

Year-end charts

Certifications

Appearances
The song "Israel's Son" was featured in the film Street Fighter II: The Animated Movie.

Notes
 The song "Stoned" is incorrectly listed as "Acid Rain" on the album's track listing.

 The song "Acid Rain" is incorrectly listed as "Blind (live)" on the album's track listing.

 The song "Blind" is incorrectly listed as "Stoned" on the album's track listing.

References

1995 debut albums
ARIA Award-winning albums
Grunge albums
Silverchair albums
Epic Records albums
Albums produced by Kevin Shirley
Murmur (record label) albums